Russell L. Blaylock (born November 15, 1945) is an author and a retired U.S. neurosurgeon.

Blaylock was a clinical assistant professor of neurosurgery at the University of Mississippi Medical Center.  In 2013 he was a visiting professor in the biology department at Belhaven College.

Blaylock has endorsed views inconsistent with the scientific consensus, including that food additives such as aspartame and monosodium glutamate (MSG) are excitotoxic in normal doses.

Education and career 

Blaylock completed his general surgical internship and neurosurgical residency at the Medical University of South Carolina in Charleston, SC. He was licensed to practice Neurological Surgery in North Carolina between May 6, 1977, and December 15, 2006. Along with Ludwig G. Kempe, Blaylock published a novel transcallosal approach to excising intraventricular meningiomas of the trigone. He is retired as a clinical assistant professor of neurosurgery from the University of Mississippi Medical Center, and is currently a visiting professor in the biology department at Belhaven University, a Christian university in Mississippi. He is associated with the Association of American Physicians and Surgeons and was on the editorial board of their journal.

Allegations of health dangers 

Blaylock claims the supposed toxicity of numerous substances that according to scientific studies are safe at customary exposure levels. He has been quoted several times in media outlets regarding his position that MSG is toxic to the brain. He also states that the widely used artificial sweetener aspartame is toxic and may be the cause of multiple sclerosis. He has additionally cautioned against heavy use of the artificial sweetener Splenda (sucralose). These positions are not supported by scientific consensus or regulatory bodies, as extensive studies support the safety of aspartame, sucralose, and MSG.

Views on politics 
Blaylock has called the American medical system 'collectivist' and has suggested that health-care reform efforts under President Obama were masterminded by extragovernmental groups that wish to impose euthanasia. He blamed the purported collectivism of American medicine for the retirement of his friend Miguel Faria. According to Blaylock, the former Soviet Union tried to spread collectivism by covertly introducing illegal drugs and various sexually transmitted diseases into the United States. Schwarcz characterized these positions as "conspiracy theories."

Views on Covid-19
Blaylock supports various Covid-19 conspiracy theories, writing that, "The COVID-19 pandemic is one of the most manipulated infectious disease events in history, characterized by official lies in an unending stream led by government bureaucracies, medical associations, medical boards, the media, and international agencies" and that the Covid-19 vaccine is a "Dangerous, essentially untested experimental vaccine." He also refers in his writing to "The designers of this pandemic..."

References

External links 
 Russell Blaylock's website No longer active. Available in Archive.org prior to Oct. 24, 2008
 The Blaylock Wellness Report
 A sceptic's view

1945 births
American neurosurgeons
Living people
Louisiana State University alumni
Pseudoscientific diet advocates
Place of birth missing (living people)
University of Mississippi faculty